XHVUC-FM is a Mexican radio station on 95.9 FM in Nava, Coahuila. The station is owned by Grupo M, is affiliated with MVS Radio and carries the FM Globo romantic format.

History
XEVUC-AM 1520 received its concession on December 13, 1976. It was owned by Maximiliano Eduardo Bravo Arenas and broadcast as a 1 kW daytimer. In 2002, the concession was transferred to Organización Radiofónica del Norte.

XEVUC moved from 1520 to 1050 kHz some time before migrating to FM as XHVUC-FM 95.9, but this change never appeared on any official list. It was previously known as La Gigante.

On October 1, 2021, XHVUC changed from a Christian talk format as Fe Activa to a romantic format, using the FM Globo brand from MVS Radio.

References

Radio stations in Coahuila